Douglas William Bracewell (born 20 January 1953) is a former New Zealand cricketer who played first-class cricket career for Central Districts and then Canterbury from 1973 until 1980. A right-arm off-break bowler, and lower-order batsman, Bracewell came from a cricketing family, with brothers John and Brendon, and nephew Doug playing Test and One Day International cricket for New Zealand. Another brother Mark and a nephew Michael also played first class cricket. 

Bracewell himself made 26 first class appearances, taking 43 wickets at a bowling average of 36.23, and he made three List-A appearances with two wickets.

Notes

External links

1953 births
Living people
Cricketers from Auckland
New Zealand cricketers
Canterbury cricketers
Central Districts cricketers
Douglas